Henri Filhol (13 May 1843 – 28 April 1902) was a French medical doctor, malacologist and naturalist born in Toulouse. He was the son of Édouard Filhol (1814-1883), curator of the Muséum de Toulouse.

After receiving his early education in Toulouse, he moved to Paris, where he obtained doctorates in medicine and science. In 1879 he was appointed professor of zoology at the Faculty of Toulouse. From 1894 to 1902 he occupied the chair of comparative animal anatomy at the Muséum national d'Histoire naturelle in Paris. In 1897 he became a member of the Académie des sciences.

In the field of paleontology, he performed important studies of fossilized mammals in the phosphorites in Quercy.

He served as the expedition doctor and naturalist on the French 1874 Transit of Venus Expedition to Campbell Island, with Filhol Peak on the island being named after him. In 1883 with Alphonse Milne-Edwards, Léon Vaillant, Edmond Perrier and others, he embarked on a scientific journey aboard the Talisman.

Filhol's Collection in the Muséum de Toulouse

References

1843 births
1902 deaths
French malacologists
French naturalists
French paleontologists
French zoologists
Physicians from Toulouse
19th-century French physicians
Academic staff of the University of Toulouse
Members of the French Academy of Sciences
Burials at Père Lachaise Cemetery
National Museum of Natural History (France) people
19th-century French scientists
Scientists from Toulouse